Sir Edward Wyndham, 2nd Baronet (c. 1667 – 29 June 1695), of Orchard Wyndham, Somerset, was three times member of parliament for Ilchester, Somerset, from 1685 to 1687, from 1689 to 1690, and from 1690 to 1695.

He was the fourth and only surviving son of Sir William Wyndham, 1st Baronet (c. 1632 – 1683) of Orchard Wyndham, MP and Sheriff of Somerset in 1679–80, by his wife Frances Hungerford, daughter of Anthony Hungerford of Farleigh Castle, Somerset.

Wyndham married to Katherine Leveson-Gower, daughter of Sir William Leveson-Gower, 4th Baronet. His heir was his son, Sir William Wyndham, 3rd Baronet (c. 1688 – 1740), of Orchard Wyndham.

References 

People from Somerset
Wyndham, Sir Edward, 2nd Baronet
1660s births
1695 deaths
Edward
English MPs 1685–1687
English MPs 1689–1690
English MPs 1690–1695